Brighton & Hove Albion Football Club is an English association football club based in the city of Brighton and Hove, East Sussex. The club was founded in 1901 and played in the Southern League from the 1901–02 season until 1920, when that league's first division was absorbed into the Football League. In 1910, they won the Southern League title and defeated Football League champions Aston Villa in the FA Charity Shield. As a Football League team, Albion have won three divisional titles at the third level of the English football league system and two at the fourth. They played in the 1983 FA Cup Final, losing to Manchester United after a replay, and their best achievement in the League Cup was in 1978–79 when they reached the quarter-final.

As of the end of the 2021–22 season, the club's first team have spent 7 seasons in the fourth tier of the English football league system, 55 in the third, 24 in the second and 9 in the top tier. The table details their achievements and the top goalscorer in senior competitions from their debut in the Southern League and FA Cup in 1901–02 to the end of the most recently completed season.

History
After Brighton United and then Brighton & Hove Rangers disbanded, a new professional football club was formed at a meeting held in the Seven Stars Hotel in June 1901. The club adopted the name Brighton & Hove Albion and took over Brighton & Hove Rangers' place in the Southern League Second Division. They also entered the FA Cup for the first time, disposing of Brighton Athletic, Eastbourne, and Hastings & St Leonards before succumbing 3–2 at home to Clapton in the third qualifying round. The Goldstone Ground became Albion's permanent home in their second season, when the club entered a team in the South Eastern League to provide additional matches on those Saturdays free of Southern League or cup fixtures. Albion lost out on the 1903 Southern League Second Division title on goal average, but gained promotion to the First Division via the test match system. The committee's recommendation against accepting the promotion on financial grounds was overruled by the membership, but their fears were justified when the club lost £1,500 on their first year's trading as a limited company. To raise income from additional matches, a team was entered in the United League in 1905–06; these matches were played in midweek, because Saturdays and public holidays during the playing season were fully taken up by the Southern League and FA Cup.

In 1909–10, they won their first major title. The Times wrote that "Brighton and Hove Albion have not had much difficulty in finishing at the head of the Southern League, and for that reason the competition has lost some of its interest, though probably the rivalry between the teams has been as keen as ever." This achievement earned them a place in the FA Charity Shield to face reigning Football League champions Aston Villa; Albion won 1–0 with a second-half goal from Charlie Webb.

Under the management of Webb, who was offered the post while awaiting repatriation from a German prisoner-of-war camp, the club joined the Football League in 1920, when a Third Division was formed from the Southern League First Division of the preceding season. Between the wars, Albion finished regularly in the top half of the Third Division South, but saved their best form for the FA Cup, eliminating numerous First Division sides from the competition. In the 1922–23 season, they were drawn to play the amateur club Corinthian in that club's first ever match in the FA Cup competition. Interest was such that the game was filmed for cinematic release, and Brighton's eventual victory, in a second replay at Chelsea's ground, Stamford Bridge, was watched by a Monday-afternoon crowd of 45,000. Ten years later, an administrative oversight meant they failed to apply for exemption to the later rounds of the FA Cup, so had to begin at the first qualifying round, progressing through eight rounds to the last 16 of the competition before losing to West Ham United after a replay.

In 1948 Albion successfully applied for re-election to the League after finishing bottom for the first time. After several near misses, they were promoted as champions to the Second Division in 1958, and five years later, two successive relegations took them into Division Four. Former Tottenham Hotspur and England centre-forward Bobby Smith's 19 goals alongside Wally Gould's 21 made a major contribution to Albion winning the Fourth Division title in 1965, and seven years later the team made a brief return to Division Two. Peter Ward's 32 goals in 1976–77 helped return the team to the Second Division, and two years later, a 3–1 victory away at Newcastle United confirmed their promotion to the First Division. In 1983, for the first time, they reached the FA Cup Final, in which they played Manchester United. The scores were level at 2–2 until the last moments of extra time, when Albion's Gordon Smith had a clear chance to score a winning goal. Peter Jones's radio commentary on the moment became famous: "and Smith  score...", he cried, just before Smith's shot was blocked by the goalkeeper's legs. Albion lost the replay 4–0, and were relegated that same season.

A sixth-place finish in 1990–91 qualified Albion for the playoffs; they beat Millwall in the semi-final, then lost 3–1 to Notts County in the final. The following season, when the newly formed FA Premier League split from the Football League, the remaining divisions of the Football League were renumbered upwards, and Albion were relegated from the "old" to the "new" Second Division. Three years later, another relegation took Albion to the bottom tier of the Football League, and financial problems meant the Goldstone Ground would be sold. From October to the penultimate game of the 1996–97 season, Albion were bottom of the League, their plight made worse by a two-point deduction for failure to control their protesting supporters, and they went into the last game needing at least a draw at Hereford United to stay in the League and relegate their opponents to the Conference. After falling behind to an own goal, Robbie Reinelt equalised in the second half to secure their League status.

Bobby Zamora's 28 League goals in each of two consecutive seasons helped his team to two successive divisional titles and promotion back to the second tier. Over the next nine seasons Albion suffered two relegations and two promotions, the first via the playoffs in 2004 and the second, as League One champions, coincident with the opening of the club's new stadium at Falmer in 2011. After a season of consolidation, three playoff semi-final defeats and a season spent flirting with relegation, Albion were Championship runners-up in 2016–17 and promoted to the Premier League for the first time. After a 15th-place finish in 2017–18, they reached the FA Cup semifinal for only the second time in the club's history in 2018–19 and narrowly avoided relegation to the Championship. Under the management of Graham Potter, their ninth place in the 2021–22 Premier League was the highest top-flight finishing position in the club's history.

Key

Key to league record:
Pld – Matches played
W – Matches won
D – Matches drawn
L – Matches lost
GF – Goals for
GA – Goals against
Pts – Points
Pos – Final position

Key to colours and symbols:

Key to divisions:
Southern 1 – Southern League First Division
Southern 2 – Southern League Second Division
South Eastern – South Eastern League
South Alliance – Southern Football Alliance
United – United League
Western 1A – Western League Division 1A
Division 1 – Football League First Division
Division 2 – Football League Second Division
Division 3 – Football League Third Division
Division 3S – Football League Third Division South
Division 4 – Football League Fourth Division
Championship – Football League Championship/EFL Championship
League One – Football League One
Premier League – Premier League

Key to rounds:
QR3 – Third qualifying round
QR4 – Fourth qualifying round, etc.
Inter – Intermediate round (between qualifying rounds and rounds proper)
R1 – First round
R2 – Second round, etc.
QF – Quarter-finals
SF – Semi-finals
F – Final
W – Winners
(S) – Southern section of regionalised stage

Details for abandoned competitions – the 1938–39 Third Division South Cup and the 1939–40 Football League – are shown in italics and appropriately footnoted.

Seasons

Notes

References

Sources

External links
Brighton & Hove Albion F.C. official website

Seasons
Brighton and Hove Albion F.C.
Brighton & Hove Albion F.C. seasons